Ultra (also recording as Rider) was an English boy band, which was most successful in the late 1990s. The original line-up consisted of James Hearn (born 19 June 1976; vocals), Michael Harwood (born 12 December 1975; guitar  and   vocals  ), Jon O'Mahony (born 10 August 1973; drums   and   vocals  ) and Nick Keynes (born 3 May 1972; bass and  vocals ).

History

Early career
Although sometimes mistakenly described as a manufactured boyband, Ultra was originally formed by James Hearn, James Rose, Michael Harwood and Jon O'Mahony who were schoolfriends from Buckinghamshire, England in the mid-1990s. After they left school, they formed various bands, playing under names such as Stepping Stoned, Decade and Suburban Surfers. They eventually called themselves Ultra (named after the Depeche Mode album), and the following year Nick Keynes joined as bass player after being introduced by mutual friend Neil Cowley, who was the keyboard player for the Brand New Heavies.

Chart success
Their demo tape eventually came to the attention of Ian Stanley (ex-Tears for Fears) and they were signed to Warner's EastWest label. In 1998, they released their first single, "Say You Do", written by Hearn, which reached #11 in the UK. Their next single, "Say It Once", charted at #16 in the UK. "The Right Time" was released in September 1998 and peaked at #28. Their fourth single was "Rescue Me", which charted in the UK at No. 8, the band's only British top 10 single.
In February 1999, their debut album, Ultra, entered the UK Albums Chart at #37.

The band were very popular with young female audiences, although they insisted that their success came primarily from their songs, not their looks. Ultra performed live and also supported a number of other pop acts including Irish boyband Boyzone in 1997, former Eternal member Louise Nurding for a performance at Wembley, and boyband 911. They were particularly popular in South East Asia and Italy, where they were mobbed by 3000 teenage girls at a record signing in Milan.

In 1999, they appeared on Italian television where they performed a live version of "Say It Once" with Laura Pausini.

Band split 
The band lost their contract before recording their second album, as all of the record company A&Rs who signed them had left, and the new hierarchy passed on the opportunity to record a follow-up. The band split up in 2001 after James Hearn became disillusioned with the music business and decided to leave. In an interview with the Daily Telegraph, Hearn said of his time in Ultra: 
"My music career was great fun and, as a bunch of guys who got together at Leeds University to give the musical bigtime a go, we had a good time".

Reunification 
In 2005, the four original members of the band reunited to write and record their second studio album, The Sun Shines Brighter, which also features songs written by former member Alistair Griffin (who provides guest vocals on one of the tracks). Producer credits on the album include Ian Stanley (who produced their first album), Claudio Guidetti (Laura Pausini, Eros Ramazzotti), and Ash Howes (Texas, Blue). This was released on 2 October 2006 on the Goldust label.

Rider
The other band members formed a new group with a number of different short term vocalists including Ryan Molloy. Singers Alistair Griffin and James Fox were both briefly members of the band at different times.

In 2002, several members of Ultra wrote and recorded a song to celebrate the World Cup, called "England Crazy", which they recorded as a one-off project as 'Rider' with Terry Venables. This project was re-signed to their old record label East West, but only reached number 46 on the UK chart due to a lacklustre campaign from the label. The song has since been featured on a number of football-themed compilation albums.

Goldust Productions
O'Mahony, Harwood and Keynes set up a music production company, Goldust, writing and producing for other artists such as Bryan Adams, Kylie Minogue, Natasha Bedingfield, Phixx and Liberty X. They have also written music for films, with title tracks on the Andy García film Modigliani, and The Magic Roundabout.

Discography

Albums

Singles

References

External links
 Ultra on Myspace
 Ultra Discography at Rate Your Music
 Ultra Discography at Discogs

English boy bands
Musical quartets
Musical groups established in 1998
Musical groups disestablished in 2001
Musical groups reestablished in 2005
Musical groups disestablished in 2006
East West Records artists